Erik Hochstein (born 1 October 1968 in Düsseldorf, North Rhine-Westphalia) is a former swimmer from Germany, who won the bronze medal in the 4×200 m freestyle relay at the 1988 Summer Olympics.

History
Hochstein started swimming competitively at age ten after watching his father and two older brothers swim. Between 1985 and 1990, he was a member of the West German National Team. Hochstein was fifteen years old.

Hochstein moved to the United States and swam for USC for three years. He coached for SCAQ 1994–1997, then took a break from swimming for more than four years. Hochstein is married and provides services for Senior citizens through a consulting business for families and through a non-profit organization called Sydney Cooper Senior Smiles.

References

1968 births
Living people
German male swimmers
Olympic swimmers of West Germany
Swimmers at the 1988 Summer Olympics
Olympic bronze medalists for West Germany
Olympic bronze medalists in swimming
German male freestyle swimmers
European Aquatics Championships medalists in swimming
Medalists at the 1988 Summer Olympics
Sportspeople from Düsseldorf
20th-century German people
21st-century German people